CRDA may refer to:

Organisations
 Amaravati Metropolitan Region Development Authority (AMRDA), an urban planning agency in India
 Calgary Roller Derby Association, a Canadian roller-derby league
 Casino Reinvestment Development Authority, a New Jersey, US state governmental agency
 Croda International (LSE stock symbol), a British chemicals company

Aviation
 Cantieri Riuniti dell'Adriatico, an Italian manufacturer in the sea and air industry from 1930 to 1966
 "C.R.D.A.", designations attached to aircraft manufactured by a related company, Cantieri Aeronautici e Navali Triestini

Other uses
 Cooperative Research and Development Agreement, an agreement between a US government agency and a private company
 Central Regulatory Domain Agent, controls wireless channels in computer networking